Prince is the second studio album by American musician Prince. It was released on October 19, 1979 by Warner Bros. Records. The album was written, arranged, composed, produced and performed entirely by Prince. Overall, Prince was regarded as more diverse than For You (1978), and performed better critically and commercially. Reviewing in Christgau's Record Guide: Rock Albums of the Seventies (1981), Robert Christgau wrote: "This boy is going to be a big star, and he deserves it".

Prince peaked at 22 on the Billboard 200 and number three on the Billboard R&B Chart. The album contained three Billboard Hot Black Singles hits: "Why You Wanna Treat Me So Bad?", "Sexy Dancer" and "I Wanna Be Your Lover". "I Wanna Be Your Lover" was Prince's first hit single on the Billboard Hot 100, peaking at number eleven while also topping the Billboard Hot Black Singles. Prince was certified Platinum by the Recording Industry Association of America (RIAA) four months after its release.

Background
The album was written, arranged, composed, produced and performed entirely by Prince. On the album credits, Prince thanks his bassist André Cymone and drummer Bobby Z. as "heaven-sent helpers".

Prince recorded the album in just a few weeks after Warner Bros. asked for a follow-up to his 1978 debut, For You. Prince had used twice his initial recording advance on the album, and it had failed to generate a pop hit (although "Soft and Wet" became a No. 12 R&B hit). Displeased at his lack of success, Prince quickly recorded the follow-up.

2019 

On October 19, 2019, Prince's estate released an acoustic demo version of "I Feel For You" as a single to celebrate the 40th anniversary of the Prince album release.

Critical reception

Overall, the album was much more diverse and well-received than For You, critically and commercially, selling three million copies. It is notable for containing standard R&B ballads performed by Prince, before he would go on to establish himself with sexual romps on later albums. The album was certified platinum and contained three R&B/dance hits: "Why You Wanna Treat Me So Bad?", "Sexy Dancer" and "I Wanna Be Your Lover." "I Wanna Be Your Lover" sold over one million copies and received a gold disc, rushing to No. 11 on the Billboard Hot 100 (becoming Prince's first hit single) and topped the R&B charts. In addition, it peaked at No. 41 in the United Kingdom (his first entry in the country) and reached number 2 on the Billboard Dance/Disco Singles chart. Prince performed both "I Wanna Be Your Lover" and "Why You Wanna Treat Me So Bad?" on American Bandstand on 26 January 1980. Overall, the success of this album geared Prince towards his next album, Dirty Mind, which would be called a complete departure from his earlier sound.

Reviewing in Christgau's Record Guide: Rock Albums of the Seventies (1981), Robert Christgau wrote: "This boy is going to be a big star, and he deserves it—he's got a great line. 'I want to come inside you' is good enough, but (in a different song) the simple 'I'm physically attracted to you' sets new standards of 'naive,' winning candor. The vulnerable teen-macho falsetto idea is pretty good too. But he does leave something to be desired in the depth-of-feeling department—you know, soul."

Track listing

Singles
 "I Wanna Be Your Lover" b/w "My Love is Forever" (US number 11, US R&B number 1, US Dance number 2, UK number 41)
 "Why You Wanna Treat Me So Bad?" b/w "Baby" (US R&B number 13)
 "Still Waiting" b/w "Bambi" (US R&B number 65)
 "Sexy Dancer" b/w "Bambi"/"Why You Wanna Treat Me So Bad?" (UK and Japan Only US Dance number 2)

Personnel 
Information taken from the Prince Vault website.
 Prince – lead vocals, backing vocals, all instrumentation, producer, arranger, remixer
 André Cymone – backing vocals on "Why You Wanna Treat Me So Bad?" (uncredited)
Technical
 Gary Brandt – engineer
 Mark Ettel – assistant engineer
 Bob Mockler – remixer
 Bernie Grundman – mastering (A&M)
 Lynn Barron – album design (RIA Images)
 George Chacon – album design (RIA Images)
 Jurgen Reisch – photography (front cover)
 Chris Callis – photography (back cover)
 Terry Taylor – calligraphy

Charts

Weekly charts

Year-end charts

Certifications

References

External links
 Prince at Discogs

1979 albums
Prince (musician) albums
Albums produced by Prince (musician)
Warner Records albums
Albums recorded in a home studio